Olha (Olga) Orlova (born 9 October 1984) is a Ukrainian former figure skater. She was the 2001 Crystal Skate of Romania bronze medalist, 2004 Ukrainian national silver medalist, and placed 26th at the 2004 European Championships.

Programs

Competitive highlights 
JGP: Junior Grand Prix

References

External links
 
 Tracings.net profile

Ukrainian female single skaters
1984 births
Living people
Sportspeople from Odesa